Aksaitovo (Aqsäyet) is a rural locality (a selo) and the administrative centre of Aksaitovsky Selsoviet, Tatyshlinsky District, Bashkortostan, Russia. The population was 794 as of 2010. There are 11 streets.

Geography 
Aksaitovo is located 21 km northwest of Verkhniye Tatyshly (the district's administrative centre) by road. Ilmetovo is the nearest rural locality.

References 

Rural localities in Tatyshlinsky District